Climate justice is a concept that addresses the just division, fair sharing, and equitable distribution of the burdens of climate change and its mitigation and responsibilities to deal with climate change. "Justice", "fairness", and "equity" are not completely identical, but they are in the same family of related terms and are often used interchangeably in negotiations and politics. Applied ethics, research and activism using these terms approach anthropogenic climate change as an ethical, legal and political issue, rather than one that is purely environmental or physical in nature. This is done by relating the causes and effects of climate change to concepts of justice, particularly environmental justice and social justice. Climate justice examines concepts such as equality, human rights, collective rights, and the historical responsibilities for climate change.

Climate justice actions can include the growing global body of legal action on climate change issues. In 2017, a report of the United Nations Environment Programme identified 894 ongoing legal actions worldwide. Climate justice is an aspect of SDG 13 under UN Agenda 2030.

Use and popularity of climate justice language has increased dramatically in recent years, yet climate justice is understood in many ways, and the different meanings are sometimes contested. At its simplest, conceptions of climate justice can be grouped along the lines of procedural justice, which emphasizes fair, transparent and inclusive decision making, and distributive justice, which places the emphasis on who bears the costs of both climate change and the actions taken to address it. Working Group II of the IPCC now adds as a third type of principles of climate justice “recognition which entails basic respect and robust engagement with and fair consideration of diverse cultures and perspectives”.  Alternatively, recognition and respect can be understood as the underlying basis for distributive and procedural justice.

A main factor in the increased popularity and consideration of climate justice was the rise of grassroots movementssuch as Fridays for Future, Ende Gelände, and Extinction Rebellion. A special focus is placed on the role of Most Affected People and Areas (MAPA), i.e., groups overall disproportionately vulnerable to or affected by climate change, such as women, racial minorities, young, older and poorer people. Historically marginalized communities, such as low income, indigenous communities and communities of color often face the worst consequences of climate change: in effect the least responsible for climate change broadly suffer its gravest consequences. They might also be further disadvantaged by responses to climate change which might reproduce or exacerbate existing inequalities, which has been labeled the 'triple injustices' of climate change.

Some climate justice approaches promote transformative justice where advocates focus on how vulnerability to climate change reflects various structural injustices in society, such as the exclusion of marginalized groups from climate resilient livelihoods, and that climate action must explicitly address these structural power imbalances. For these advocates, at a minimum, priority is placed on ensuring that responses to climate change do not repeat or reinforce existing injustices, which has both distributive justice and procedural justice dimensions.

Other conceptions frame climate justice in terms of the need to curb climate change within certain limits, like the Paris Agreement targets of 1.5 °C, as otherwise the impacts of climate change on natural ecosystems will be so severe as to preclude the possibility of justice for many generations and populations. Other activists argue that failure to address social implications of climate change mitigation transitions could result in profound economic and social tensions and delay necessary changes while ways that reduce greenhouse gas emissions in a socially just waycalled a 'just transition'are possible, preferable, in better agreement with contemporary human rights, fairer, more ethical as well as possibly more effective.

Aspects and considerations

Disproportionality between causality and burden 

The responsibility for anthropogenic climate change differs substantially among individuals and groups. Studies find that the most affluent citizens of the world are responsible for most environmental impacts, and robust action by them is necessary for prospects of moving towards safer environmental conditions.

According to a 2020 report by Oxfam and the Stockholm Environment Institute, the richest 1% of the global population have caused twice as much carbon emissions as the poorest 50% over the 25 years from 1990 to 2015. This was, respectively, during that period, 15% of cumulative emissions compared to 7%.

The bottom half of the population is directly-responsible for less than 20% of energy footprints and consume less than the top 5% in terms of trade-corrected energy. High-income individuals usually have higher energy footprints as they disproportionally use their larger financial resourceswhich they can usually spend freely in their entirety for any purpose as long as the end user purchase is legalfor energy-intensive goods. In particular, the largest disproportionality was identified to be in the domain of transport, where e.g. the top 10% consume 56% of vehicle fuel and conduct 70% of vehicle purchases.

Aggravating the problem of injustice from disproportionate causality, many of the people and nations most affected by climate change are among the least responsible for it. A study projected that, depending on scenarios, regions inhabited by 1 to 3 billion people could become as hot as the hottest parts of the Sahara (a maximum annual temperature of >29 °C) within 50 years if there is no change in patterns of population growth, climate change is not limited to below 1.5 °C and these people do not migrate. It found most of these affected regions have little adaptive capacity as of 2020. One of the problems could be increased drought severity worldwide.

A study concluded that to total emissions, investments of the global top 1% are far more important than their personal consumption and that the pollution gap is larger within countries than between countries.

Its results include that:
 the "bottom 50% of the world population emitted 12% of global emissions in 2019, whereas the top 10% emitted 48% of the total"
 since 1990, "the bottom 50% of the world population has been responsible for only 16% of all emissions growth, whereas the top 1% has been responsible for 23% of the total"
 "per-capita emissions of the global top 1% increased since 1990, [while] emissions from low- and middle-income groups within rich countries declined"

Responsibility and causes 
Responsibility for climate change has been attributed to:
 fossil fuel companies
 consumers purchasing fossil fuels and goods produced using fossil fuels
 structures that distribute power and wealth to the fossil fuel companies
 lack of public and contemporary free private investment into sustainable development
 lack of alternatives (e.g. public transport infrastructure and advanced sustainable energy grids)
 lack of policies that reduce fossil fuel consumption or their harmful effects
 lack of change development (e.g. eco-tariffs, new socioeconomic designs, changes in subsidization and financial allocations, sustainability certifications)

Many policies (and contemporary private endeavors such as voluntary ones by billionaires or asset managers) may often have well-intentioned substantial positive environmental effects. But these may amount to (or have the purpose of) greenwashing. Or they may fall short of climate goals and policies since politics is often based on compromise.

Intergenerational equity 

The current nation states and world population need to make changes, including sacrifices (like uncomfortable lifestyle-changes, alterations to public spending and changes to choice of work), today to enable climate justice for future generations.

Preventable severe effects are projected to likely occur during the lifetime of the present adult population. Under current climate policy pledges, children born in 2020 (e.g. "Generation Alpha") will experience over their lifetimes, 2–7 times as many heat waves, as well as more of other extreme weather events compared to people born in 1960. This, along with other projections, raises issues of intergenerational equity as it was these generations (specific groups and individuals and their collective governance and perpetuated economics) who have been mainly responsible for the burden of climate change.

This illustrates the general fact that emissions produced by any given generation can lock-in damage for one or more future generations, making climate change progressively more threatening for the generations affected than for the generation responsible for the threats. Crucially, the climate system contains tipping points, such as the amount of deforestation of the Amazon that will launch the forest’s irreversible decline. A generation whose continued emissions drive the climate system past such significant tipping points inflicts severe injustice on multiple future generations.

Disproportionate impacts on disadvantaged groups 

Disadvantaged groups will continue to be disproportionately impacted as climate change persists. These groups will be affected due to inequalities that are based on demographic characteristics such as differences in gender, race, ethnicity, age, and income. Inequality increases the exposure of disadvantaged groups to the harmful effects of climate change while also increasing their susceptibility to destruction caused by climate change. The damage is worsened because disadvantaged groups are the last to receive emergency relief and are rarely included in the planning process at local, national and international levels for coping with the impacts of climate change.

Communities of color, women, indigenous groups, and people of low-income all face a larger vulnerability to climate change. These groups will be disproportionately impacted due to heat waves, air quality, and extreme weather events. These groups will be disproportionately impacted due to heat waves, air quality, and extreme weather events. Women are also disadvantaged and will be affected by climate change differently than men. This may impact the ability of minority groups to adapt unless steps are taken to provide these groups with more access to universal resources. Indigenous groups are affected by the consequences of climate change even though they historically have contributed the least. In addition, indigenous peoples are unjustifiably impacted due to their low income, and they continue to have fewer resources to cope with climate change.

The ability of populations to mitigate and adapt to the negative consequences of climate change are shaped by factors such as income, race, class, gender, capital and political representation. Low income communities as well as colored communities possess little to no adaptive resources, making them particularly vulnerable to climate change. People living in poverty or in precarious circumstances tend to have neither the resources nor the insurance coverage necessary to recover from environmental disasters. On top of that, such populations often receive an unequal share of disaster relief and recovery assistance. Additionally, they generally have less say and involvement in decision-making, political, and legal processes that relate to climate change and the natural environment.

One way to achieve distributive climate justice in mitigating the disproportionate impact of climate change is through procedural climate justice involving disadvantaged groups in the planning and policymaking process. This would also help minority groups achieve more access to resources to adapt and plan for a changing climate.

Climate migrants

Responses to improve climate justice 
Already in the present and based on existing laws, some relevant parties can be forced into action (to the degree of accountability, monitoring and law enforcement capacities and assessments of feasibility) by means of courts. In 2019, the Supreme Court of the Netherlands confirmed that the government must cut carbon dioxide emissions further, as climate change threatens citizens' human rights.

Common principles of justice in burden-sharing 
There are three common principles of justice in burden-sharing that can be used in decision-making related to who bears the larger burdens of climate change globally and domestically: a) those who most caused the problem, b) those who have the most burden-carrying ability and c) those who have benefited most from the activities that cause climate change. Another method of deciding starts from the objective of preventing climate change e.g. beyond 1.5 °C and from there reason back to who should do what. This makes use of the principles of justice in burden-sharing to maintain fairness.

One example of how the concept of climate justice is relevant to policies and society is the problem of determining how fast a fossil fuel extraction phase out should be or how large the amount of unextractable fossil fuels in a country should be. Another example is the degree to which those who are considered to be main causes of the problem of climate change should be enabled and allowed to hold onto their wealth and powerfor instance, some of the fossil fuels companies that freely invest into renewable energies to slowly transform into renewable energy companies.

Litigation

Climate justice protests

Political approaches towards climate justice 

The early 21st centuryparticularly the decade 2020 to 2030became the time in which both relatively large shares of populationsin and outside of formal democraciesrealized that urgent serious action towards climate change mitigationclimate justice for young and future generationsneed to be taken and which scientific research indicated to contain the last closing window of opportunity for mitigating climate change to a manageable, potentially justifiable level. Scientific data indicates that, assuming 2021 emissions levels, humanity has a carbon budget equivalent to 11 years of emissions left for limiting warming to 1.5 °C, although there are deep concerns over potential tipping points that could be triggered even before that carbon budget is used up. These are main reasons why many scientists are calling for the declaration of and, critically, adequate action upon a state of "climate emergency".

Some of the relevant elite groupsparticularly WTO, IMF, World Bank and OECDwere found to have been incompetent or unwilling to solve climate change, making their rhetoric ultimately meaningless, partly by continuously including what some consider "globalism" and "ethics of growth" in their perpetuated rhetoric.

In terms of political approaches, some researchers identified a need for a participatory deliberative democracy model of political decision-making in which voting-related decisions are not made via polarized opinions spurred via possibly imperfect media and education and immediate near-term impacts but gain their legitimacy via authentic deliberation.

Citizens' juries could be "a deliberative democracy tool that allows a demographically representative sample of the population to learn about a contested issue from experts, and discuss, debate and develop policy recommendations".

A study found that fossil fuels, strengthening climate education and engagement, and disclosing greenhouse gas emissions information have "moral implications" and proposes social tipping elements (STEs) to be "subdomains of the planetary socioeconomic system where the required disruptive change may take place and lead to a sufficiently fast reduction in anthropogenic greenhouse gas emissions".

Human rights

Debates and issues

Fundamental differences in economic systems as a root cause 

One contentious issue in debates about climate justice is whether fundamental differences in economic systems, such as capitalism versus socialism, are the, or a, root cause of climate injustice. In this context, fundamental disagreements arise between, on the one hand, liberal and conservative environmental groups and, on the other, leftist and radical organizations. While the former often tend to blame the excesses of neoliberalism for climate change and argue in favor of market-based reform within capitalism, the latter view capitalism with its exploitative traits as the underlying central issue. Other possible causal explanations include hierarchies based on the group differences and the nature of the fossil fuel regime itself.

Systemic causes 
It has been argued that the unwarranted rate of climate change, along with its inequality of burdens, is a structural injustice. There is political responsibility for the maintenance and support of historically constituted structural processes. This is despite assumed viable potential alternative models based on novel technologies and means. As a criterion for determining responsibility for climate change, individual causal contribution or capacity does not matter as much as the responsibility for the perpetuation of effectively carbon-intensive structures, practices, and institutions. These structures constitute the global politico-economic system, rather than enabling structural changes towards a system that does not naturally facilitate unsustainable exploitation of people and nature. 

The study noted that the common demand by grassroots movements expressed in the slogan "system change not climate change" may correctly identify the scope of the challenge. While there may have been some cases of active prevention of transformative changes, responsibilities due to a lack of changes in policy may be more difficult to discern, with relevant domains possibly including education policy, media policy, the selection of issues in political campaigns, meta policy, changes to the policy cycle and to what degree required unprofitable transformative work is enabled and facilitated instead of structurally inhibited. However, without discrete political goals and obligations such a root-cause determination of responsibility risks absolving individual responsibility within an anonymous structure, especially as powerful political or corporate leaders have the ability to make certain pro-mitigation decisions even if they are not as rational, beneficial or effective as if the structural context would facilitate these decisions (e.g. for being the economically "most profitable" choice). Furthermore, such decisions by leaders may often be considered impossible or highly irrational by the respective parties partly due to a core principle of self-preservation (e.g. of a company, a political party in power or for a national economy) within the contemporary structures even when complemented with other relevant domestic or international policies.

For others, climate justice could be pursued through existing economic frameworks, global organizations and policy mechanisms. Therefore, for them the root-causes could be found in the causes that so far inhibited global implementation of measures like emissions trading schemes, specifically of forms that deliver the assumed mitigation results.

Reduced efficiency 

Some may see climate justice arguments for compensation by rich countries for disasters and similar problems in developing countries (as well as possibly domestically) as a way for "limitless liability" by which at least high levels of such could drain resources, efforts, focus and financial funds away from efficient preventive climate change mitigation towards e.g. immediate climate change relief compensations or less efficient intervention or climate-unrelated expenses of the receiving country or people.

Disruption of social stability, jobs and uncomfortable changes 

Climate justice may often conflict with social stability whereby e.g. interventions that establish a more just pricing of products could facilitate social unrest and interventions of socioeconomic decarbonization could lead to, not only decreased e.g. material possessions, number of freely choosable options, comfort, maintained habits and salaries, but also at least temporary increased unemployment rates which may be problematic with contemporary psychology (possibly including norms, expectations, conscience, pressures, feedbacks, bias, plasticity and awareness) and socioeconomic structures (possibly including structural facilitation mechanisms for economic activities, enforceable policies, media systems and education apparatuses) even though multiple studies estimate that if a rapid transitions were to be implemented in certain ways the number of full-time jobs formally recognized in the economy could increase overallalbeit not addressing topics such as retrainingat least temporarily due to the increased demand for labor to e.g. build public infrastructure and other "green jobs" to build the renewable energy system. Even though accumulating evidence suggests that people who are living more environmentally friendly lifestyles are happier, according to a study "current strategies for encouraging lifestyle change aren't working". Many of the measures that could decrease social stability could also decrease public political support and political stability or make such more difficult to maintain.

Public political support 
Due to mechanisms of politics and possibly partly due to an earlier neglection of enacting required policies and relevant education of citizens via education systems and media, the urgency for and extent of policies, especially when seeking to facilitate lifestyle-changes and shifts on the scale of entire industries, could not only lead to social tension but also decrease levels of public support for political parties in power. For instance, in contemporary socioeconomic structures keeping gas prices low is often "really good for the poor and the middle class". This may make it more difficult or less rational for political parties to enact such decisions across the world in cases where the national, rather than international, level is adequate. Citizens often form their opinions based on peer opinions and media as well as according to their personal near-term interests. Endorsements of policieswhich historically have often been highly suboptimalthat come from an untrusted source may lower citizens' policy support and competing political campaigns and outreach, a key mechanism of politics, as well as online misinformation may further exploit early public discontent with policies, especially when combined ubiquitously with other grave imperfections and ignorance of relevant political parties. The dilemma that links this problem to the concept of climate justice is that interestsin particular extrapolated interests based on scientific data and projectionsof hypothetical yet-unborn generations are not suitably represented and considered in today's climate policy-making, which is further complicated in that the already living young generations that will suffer most from climate change receive a politically equal voice and that large shares of voters generally do not have a good quality understanding of the projected likely effects of climate change and other relevant conditions. Public support could also be decreased by decisions for large financial transfers for the purpose of achieving climate justice, making this a challenging task including in cases where this money largely comes from taxing the general population rather than more select subgroups.

Perceived injustice, conflict and legitimacy 
Perceived injustice is a frequent source of conflict, which, beyond being a source of socioeconomic instability, may additionally inhibit strategic, less subjective, constructive efforts and changes as well as decrease public support for climate change mitigation measures, especially when considering the relatively low severity of effects to date. Perceived injustices may also challenge legitimacies, including those in the future.

Conflicting interest-driven interpretations as barriers to agreements 

Substantially different interpretations and perspectives, arising from different interests, needs, circumstances, expectations, considerations and histories, can lead to substantially varying conceptions of what is "fair". Such may lead to countries effectively making it more difficult to reach an agreement, similar to the prisoner's dilemma. Developing effective, legitimate, enforceable agreements could thereby be substantially complicated, especially if traditional ways or tools of policy-making are used, in-sum trusted third party expert authorities are absent and the scientific research base relevant for the decision-makingsuch as studies and data about the problem, potential mitigation measures and capacitiesis not robust. Fundamental fairness principles include or could be:
Responsibility
Capability and
Rights (needs)
for which country characteristics can predict relative support. The shared problem-characteristics of climate change could incentivize developing countries to act in concert to deter developed countries from "passing their climate costs onto them" and thereby improve the global mitigation effectiveness to 1.5 °C.

Fossil-fuels dependent states

Fossil fuel phase out are projected to affect statesand their citizenswith large or central industries of fossil-fuels extractionincluding OPEC statesdifferently than other nations. It was found that they have obstructed climate negotiations and it was argued that many of them have large amounts of wealth due to which they should not need to receive financial support from other countries but could implement  adequate  transitions on their own in terms of  financial  resources. A study found that governments of nations which have historically benefited from extraction should take the lead, with countries that have a high dependency on fossil fuels but low capacity for transition needing some support to follow. In particular, transitional impacts of a rapid phase out of extraction is thought to be better absorbed in diversified, wealthier economies which should bear discrepancies in costs needed for a "just transition" as they are most able to bear it and may have better capacities for enacting absorptive socioeconomic policies.

Less ambitious mitigation 

While "climate justice" and justice in terms of climate change mitigation is mainly concerned with the procedural and distributive ethical dimensions of and for climate change mitigation, there are also concerns that climate justice could be used as an excuse or moral justification by developing, undeveloped or later-developed nations for less ambitious climate change mitigation goals as they have emitted less greenhouse gases in the past. Justifications of larger emissions with climate justice may also be obstructed in that e.g. the awareness of the greenhouse emission effects has increased, that the scientific consensus and data has grown to be more robust since the before the 1970s and that alternative options have become comparatively cheaper or have been developed further so that they are easier to adopt. Nevertheless, a philosopher remarked that China, currently the largest emitter of CO2, used its emissions to basically lead "the biggest anti-poverty movement the world has ever seen", showing that degrees of emissions would need to be assessed for moral justifyability on a case-by-case basis. Many developing countries find that climate justice demands that developing countries can grow despite little carbon budgets, and, due to contemporary socioeconomic conditions, demand to receive the right to continue to emit carbon until a time later than net-zero-emissions-targets of many developed countries that have higher historic cumulative emissions per capita.

History 

The concept of climate justice was deeply influential on climate negotiations years before the term "climate justice" was regularly applied to the concept. In December 1990 the United Nations appointed an Intergovernmental Negotiating Committee (INC) to draft what became the Framework Convention on Climate Change (FCCC), adopted at the UN Conference on the Environment and Development (UNCED) in Rio de Janeiro in June 1992.  As the name “Environment and Development” indicated, the fundamental goal was to coordinate action on climate change with action on sustainable development. It was impossible to draft the text of the FCCC without confronting central questions of climate justice concerning how to share the responsibilities of slowing climate change fairly between developed nations and developing nations. 

The issue of the fair terms for sharing responsibility was raised forcefully for the INC by statements about climate justice from developing countries. In response, the FCCC adopted the now-famous (and still-contentious) principles of climate justice embodied in Article 3.1: "The Parties should protect the climate system for the benefit of present and future generations of humankind, on the basis of equity and in accordance with their common but differentiated responsibilities and respective capabilities. Accordingly, the developed country Parties should take the lead in combating climate change and the adverse effects thereof."  The first principle of climate justice embedded in Article 3.1 is that calculations of benefits (and burdens) must include not only those for the present generation but also those for future generations. The second is that responsibilities are "common but differentiated", that is, every country has some responsibilities, but equitable responsibilities are different for different types of countries. The third is that a crucial instance of different responsibilities is that in fairness developed countries' responsibilities must be greater. How much greater continues to be debated politically.

In 2000, at the same time as the Sixth Conference of the Parties (COP 6), the first Climate Justice Summit took place in The Hague. This summit aimed to "affirm that climate change is a rights issue" and to "build alliances across states and borders" against climate change and in favor of sustainable development.

Subsequently, in August–September 2002, international environmental groups met in Johannesburg for the Earth Summit. At this summit, also known as Rio+10, as it took place ten years after the 1992 Earth Summit, the Bali Principles of Climate Justice were adopted.

In 2004, the Durban Group for Climate Justice was formed at an international meeting in Durban, South Africa. Here representatives from NGOs and peoples' movements discussed realistic policies for addressing climate change.

In 2007 at the 13th Conference of the Parties (COP 13) in Bali, the global coalition Climate Justice Now! was founded, and, in 2008, the Global Humanitarian Forum focused on climate justice at its inaugural meeting in Geneva.

In 2009, the Climate Justice Action Network was formed during the run-up to the Copenhagen Summit. It proposed civil disobedience and direct action during the summit, and many climate activists used the slogan 'system change not climate change'.

In April 2010, the World People's Conference on Climate Change and the Rights of Mother Earth took place in Tiquipaya, Bolivia. It was hosted by the government of Bolivia as a global gathering of civil society and governments. The conference published a "People's Agreement" calling, among other things, for greater climate justice.

In September 2013 the Climate Justice Dialogue convened by the Mary Robinson Foundation and the World Resources Institute released their Declaration on Climate Justice in an appeal to those drafting the proposed agreement to be negotiated at COP-21 in Paris in 2015.

In December 2018, the People's Demands for Climate Justice, signed by 292,000 individuals and 366 organizations, called upon government delegates at COP24 to comply with a list of six climate justice demands. One of the demands was to "Ensure developed countries honor their “Fair Shares” for largely fueling this crisis."

Examples

Subsistence farmers in Latin America 
Several studies that investigated the impacts of climate change on agriculture in Latin America suggest that in the poorer countries of Latin America, agriculture composes the most important economic sector and the primary form of sustenance for small farmers. Maize is the only grain still produced as a sustenance crop on small farms in Latin American nations. The projected decrease of this grain and other crops can threaten the welfare and the economic development of subsistence communities in Latin America. Food security is of particular concern to rural areas that have weak or non-existent food markets to rely on in the case food shortages. In August 2019, Honduras declared a state of emergency when a drought caused the southern part of the country to lose 72% of its corn and 75% of its beans. Food security issues are expected to worsen across Central America due to climate change. It is predicted that by 2070, corn yields in Central America may fall by 10%, beans by 29%, and rice by 14%. With Central American crop consumption dominated by corn (70%), beans (25%), and rice (6%), the expected drop in staple crop yields could have devastating consequences.

The expected impacts of climate change on subsistence farmers in Latin America and other developing regions are unjust for two reasons. First, subsistence farmers in developing countries, including those in Latin America are disproportionately vulnerable to climate change Second, these nations were the least responsible for causing the problem of anthropogenic induced climate.

Disproportionate vulnerability to climate disasters is socially determined. For example, socioeconomic and policy trends affecting smallholder and subsistence farmers limit their capacity to adapt to change. A history of policies and economic dynamics has negatively impacted rural farmers. During the 1950s and through the 1980s, high inflation and appreciated real exchange rates reduced the value of agricultural exports. As a result, farmers in Latin America received lower prices for their products compared to world market prices. Following these outcomes, Latin American policies and national crop programs aimed to stimulate agricultural intensification. These national crop programs benefitted larger commercial farmers more. In the 1980s and 1990s low world market prices for cereals and livestock resulted in decreased agricultural growth and increased rural poverty.

Perceived vulnerability to climate change differs even within communities, as in the example of subsistence farmers in Calakmul, Mexico.

Adaptive planning is challenged by the difficulty of predicting local scale climate change impacts. A crucial component to adaptation should include government efforts to lessen the effects of food shortages and famines. Planning for equitable adaptation and agricultural sustainability will require the engagement of farmers in decision making processes.

Hurricane Katrina

Because of climate change, tropical cyclones are expected to increase in intensity and have increased rainfall, and have larger storm surges, but there might be fewer of them globally. These changes are driven by rising sea temperatures and increased maximum water vapour content of the atmosphere as the air heats up. Hurricane Katrina in 2005 provided insights into how climate change disasters affect different people individually, as it had a disproportionate effect on low-income and minority groups. A study on the race and class dimensions of Hurricane Katrina suggests that those most vulnerable include poor, black, brown, elderly, sick, and homeless people. Low-income and black communities had little resources and limited mobility to evacuate before the storm. Also, after the hurricane, low-income communities were most affected by contamination, and this was made worse by the fact that government relief measures failed to adequately assist those most at risk.

See also

References

Further reading 
 Dolšak, Nives; Prakash, Aseem (2022). "Three Faces of Climate Justice". Annual Review of Political Science. 25 (1): 283–301.
 Homeberg, Marc van den; McQuistan, Colin (2018). "Technology for Climate Justice: A Reporting Framework for Loss and Damage as Part of Key Global Agreements". Loss and Damage from Climate Change. 513-545.
 Department of Economics and Social Affairs, UN (2017). "". Climate Change and Social Inequality.

External links 
In-depth Q&A: What is 'climate justice'? Carbon Brief, 2021.

Climate change and society
Climate change policy
Environmental ethics
.
Social justice